Kevin Cameron has been an editor at Cycle World magazine since 1991, before which he was an editor at Cycle for almost twenty years, and a race tuner from the early 1970s through the 1980s. He is also an author of many books on motorcycles specializing in performance and engineering. Cameron is a graduate of Harvard University, where he studied physics.

Bibliography

References

External links
 

American columnists

Living people
Motorcycle journalists
Motorcycling writers
Harvard University alumni
Year of birth missing (living people)